Cheng Jin-shan (born 4 April 1974) is a Taiwanese bobsledder. He competed in the two man and the four man events at the 1998 Winter Olympics.

References

1974 births
Living people
Taiwanese male bobsledders
Olympic bobsledders of Taiwan
Bobsledders at the 1998 Winter Olympics
Place of birth missing (living people)
20th-century Taiwanese people